The đàn tam (chữ Nôm: 彈三) is a three-stringed ("tam" means "three") fretless plucked Vietnamese musical instrument. It has a long fingerboard, and the body is traditionally partially covered by a snake skin stretched over a rounded rectangular resonator. It is similar to the Chinese sanxian. It is used in tuồng theatre.

References

Vietnamese musical instruments
String instruments